Patrick David Barr (13 February 1908 – 29 August 1985) was an English actor. In his career spanning over half a century, he appeared in about 144 films and television series.

Biography
Born in Akola, British India in 1908, Barr was educated at Radley College and Trinity College, Oxford, where he rowed in the 1929 Boat Race and achieved a Blue.  He went from stage to screen with The Merry Men of Sherwood (1932). He spent the 1930s playing various beneficent authority figures and "reliable friend" types. 

As a conscientious objector during the Second World War, Barr helped people in the Blitz in London's East End before serving with the Friends' Ambulance Unit in Africa. There he met his wife Anne "Jean" Williams, marrying her after ten days; it would have been sooner, but they needed permission from London.

In 1946, he picked up where he had left off, and in the early 1950s he began working in British television, attaining a popularity greater than he had while playing supporting parts in such films as The Case of the Frightened Lady (1940) and The Blue Lagoon (1949).

This popularity enabled Barr to obtain better roles and command a higher salary for his films of the 1950s and 1960s. Some of the films in which he appeared during this period were The Dam Busters (1955), Room in the House (1955), Saint Joan (1957), Next to Next Time (1960), Billy Liar (1963), The First Great Train Robbery (1979) and Octopussy (1983). On television, he appeared in Doctor Who in 1967 as Hobson in the serial entitled The Moonbase; in the 1970 Randall & Hopkirk (Deceased) episode "You Can Always Find a Fall Guy" and appeared once in The Avengers. In the 1981 BBC Radio 4 adaptation of The Lord of the Rings, Barr voiced the role of Gamling.

Selected filmography

 Meet My Sister (1933) – Bob Seymour
 Irish Hearts (1934) – Dr. Connellan
 Gay Old Dog (1935) – Phillip
 Things to Come (1936) – World Transport Official (uncredited)
 Wednesday's Luck (1936) – Jim Carfax
 East Meets West (1936) – O'Flaherty
 Midnight at Madame Tussaud's (1936) – Gerry Melville
 The Cavalier of the Streets (1937) – The Cavalier
 The Show Goes On (1937) – Designer
 Return of the Scarlet Pimpernel (1937) – Lord Hastings
 Sunset in Vienna (1937) – Ludwig (uncredited)
 Sailing Along (1938) – Seaman at Birthday Party (uncredited)
 Incident in Shanghai (1938) – Pat Avon
 Star of the Circus (1938) – Truxa
 Meet Mr. Penny (1938) – Clive Roberts
 Yellow Sands (1938) – Arthur Varwell
 The Gaunt Stranger (1938) – Det. Insp. Alan Wembury
 Marigold (1938) – Lt. Archie Forsyth
 Let's Be Famous (1939) – John Blake
 Contraband (1940) – Undetermined Role (uncredited)
 The Case of the Frightened Lady (1940) – Richard Ferraby
 The Blue Lagoon (1949) – Second Mate
 Man on the Run (1949) – Detective at Cabby's Restaurant
 Adam and Evelyne (1949) – Bert – Adam's Friend (uncredited)
 Golden Arrow (1949) – Hedy's Husband
 To Have and to Hold (1951) – Brian
 The Lavender Hill Mob (1951) – Divisional Detective Inspector
 The Story of Robin Hood and His Merrie Men (1952) – King Richard
 Death of an Angel (1952) – Robert Welling
 You're Only Young Twice (1952) – Sir Archibald Asher
 King of the Underworld (1952) – Inspector John Morley
 Murder at Scotland Yard (1952) – Inspector John Morley
 Black Orchid (1953) – Vincent Humphries
 Sailor of the King (1953) – Capt. Tom Ashley, HMS 'Amesbury'
 I vinti (1953) – Ken Wharton
 The Intruder (1953) – Inspector Williams
 Black 13 (1953) – Robert
 Escape by Night (1953) – Insp. Frampton
 Duel in the Jungle (1954) – Supt. Roberts
 Seagulls Over Sorrento (1954) – Cmdr. Sinclair
 Time Is My Enemy (1954) – John Everton
 The Brain Machine (1955) – Dr. Geoffrey Allen
 The Dam Busters (1955) – Captain Joseph (Mutt) Summers, C.B.E.
 Room in the House (1955) – Jack Richards
 It's Never Too Late (1956) – Charles Hammond
 Saint Joan (1957) – Captain La Hire
 At the Stroke of Nine (1957) – Frank
 Lady of Vengeance (1957) – Inspector Madden
 Next to No Time (1958) – Jerry Lane
 Urge to Kill (1960) – Superintendent Allen
 The Valiant (1962) – Reverend Ellis
 The Longest Day (1962) – Group Captain James Stagg (uncredited)
 Billy Liar (1963) – Insp. MacDonald
 Ring of Spies (1964) – Captain Warner
 Last of the Long-haired Boys (1968) – Conyers
 Guns in the Heather (1969) – Lord Boyne
 The Flesh and Blood Show (1972) – Major Bell / Sir Arnold Gates
 The Satanic Rites of Dracula (1973) – Lord Carradine
 House of Whipcord (1974) – Justice Bailey
 The Black Windmill (1974) – Gen. St. John
 The First Great Train Robbery (1979) – Burke
 Home Before Midnight (1979) – The Judge
 Octopussy (1983) – British Ambassador

Television Series
Inspector Morley: Late of Scotland Yard (1952) - (seven episodes) - (with Dorothy Bramhall, Tucker McGuire, Tod Slaughter, and Johnny Briggs (actor)).

References

External links
 
 

1908 births
1985 deaths
English male film actors
English male television actors
People educated at Radley College
Alumni of Trinity College, Oxford
English conscientious objectors
People associated with the Friends' Ambulance Unit
People from Akola
20th-century English male actors
British people in colonial India
20th-century Quakers